Christopher Winslow Garner (born February 23, 1975) is an American former professional basketball player who played in the National Basketball Association (NBA).

College career
Garner played collegiately at the University of Memphis.

Professional career
Garner, a 5'10" (1.78 m) point guard, was not drafted by an NBA franchise but played parts of 2 seasons with the Toronto Raptors and Golden State Warriors; 1997–1998, and 2000–2001, respectively. In 2003, he was signed by the Detroit Pistons, but was waived prior to the start of the 2003-04 NBA season.

He played one season with the Memphis Houn'Dawgs in the ABA.

Garner also played professionally in Lithuania, France, Israel, Cyprus, Greece, and other countries.

References

External links
 
NBA stats @ basketballreference.com

1975 births
Living people
Achilleas Kaimakli players
African-American basketball players
American expatriate basketball people in Canada
American expatriate basketball people in Cyprus
American expatriate basketball people in France
American expatriate basketball people in Greece
American expatriate basketball people in Israel
American expatriate basketball people in Lithuania
American expatriate basketball people in Poland
American expatriate basketball people in Venezuela
American men's basketball players
Apollon Patras B.C. players
Basketball players from Memphis, Tennessee
BC Žalgiris players
Cholet Basket players
Cocodrilos de Caracas players
Fort Wayne Fury players
Golden State Warriors players
Gymnastikos S. Larissas B.C. players
Idaho Stampede (CBA) players
Maccabi Givat Shmuel players
Maccabi Rishon LeZion basketball players
Memphis Tigers men's basketball players
Paris Racing Basket players
Point guards
STB Le Havre players
Toronto Raptors players
Undrafted National Basketball Association players
Yakima Sun Kings players
21st-century African-American sportspeople
20th-century African-American sportspeople